Kevin Vuong  (born ) is a Canadian politician serving as the member of Parliament (MP) for Spadina—Fort York since the 2021 federal election, sitting as an Independent. While Vuong was nominated as a Liberal Party candidate, the party disavowed him days before the election, following reports of an ongoing lawsuit against him as well as a dropped sexual assault charge from 2019, which he had failed to disclose during the party's internal vetting process. As nominations had already closed by that point, Vuong remained on the ballot as a Liberal and was elected.

Prior to entering politics, Vuong worked in the business and finance industry and served as a reserve officer in the Royal Canadian Navy.

Background 
Vuong's parents are refugees from the Vietnam War. He grew up in Brampton, Ontario.

Vuong was a member of the Canadian Y20 delegation to the 2013 G20 Summit. He led multilateral negotiations for two working groups — international financial regulation and infrastructure development — and he and his team presented a final report to the president of Russia, Vladimir Putin, and other G20 leaders on combating global tax havens.

Military career 
Vuong joined the Canadian Forces Naval Reserve as an intelligence officer in 2015. After three years, he completed an occupational transfer to join the public affairs branch, and was promoted to the rank of Sub-Lieutenant in 2021. Vuong served as a public affairs officer at  York.

In November 2020, Vuong was named as a NATO 2030 Young Leader for Canada, the only Canadian, to join 13 other leaders to advise him on the future of the 30-member Alliance. On July 20, 2022, Vuong was fined $500 for not following the Queen's Regulations and Orders for the Canadian Forces, which required him to notify his commanding officer of the withdrawn charge.

Political career

Municipal politics 
Vuong advocated for a price for congestion with Canada's Ecofiscal Commission, penning an opinion-editorial with economist and commission chair Christopher Ragan, that highlighted the social costs to youth and people of colour. He was co-chair of the Toronto Youth Equity Strategy, where he helped to secure $958,000 for youth social infrastructure and fought to give youth a meaningful role in police governance and racial discrimination and lost of trust in policing. This included the designation of an annual Youth Week in Toronto. Vuong also advocated for programming for vulnerable youth and against the cancellation of affordable "Youth Days" at the Canadian National Exhibition. He pushed the City of Toronto for specific roles, representation, and powers to young people, particularly in city planning issues. While pursuing his master's degree, he hosted a two-day summit to inspire a more sustainable and inclusive Toronto backed by United Nations (UN)-Habitat on the UN New Urban Agenda and the Sustainable Development Goals.

2018 Toronto City Council campaign 
Vuong ran for Toronto City Council in Ward 10 Spadina—Fort York during the 2018 municipal election. His campaign was focused on highlighting the lack of services and infrastructure downtown, an understanding of vertical living that leveraged his many years as president of his condominium board, and climate adaptation and action for vertical communities. During the campaign, the conversion of King Street as a popular thoroughfare to a transit-focused street hit a flashpoint. Vuong organized "King Street Eats" to help local restaurants adapt and attract customers. He claims he was pressured to drop out of the race by incumbent councillor Joe Cressy. Vuong received an endorsement from the Toronto Sun.

2021 Canadian federal election 
Shortly before 2021 Canadian federal election, the Toronto Star reported on August 10 that Vuong was expected to be tapped by the Liberal Party as the candidate for Spadina-Fort York following incumbent MP Adam Vaughan's surprise announcement of his retirement. The Liberals announced that he was acclaimed the candidate on August 13.

Legal issues 
On September 1, 2021, The Globe and Mail and other media outlets reported that Vuong was also involved in a $1.5 million lawsuit filed against him for his mask making business, TakeCare Supply.

On September 16, the Toronto Star reported through the release of court documents that Vuong had been charged with sexual assault in 2019. The charges to this case were dropped shortly after. Vuong did not disclose either the withdrawn charge or the ongoing lawsuit to the Liberal Party, despite it being a requirement that he disclose such information during the vetting process.

Vuong has said that he would like to "unequivocally state that these allegations are false" and that "I vigorously fought these allegations when they were initially brought forward. The allegations were withdrawn. Had they not been withdrawn, I would have continued to defend myself against these false allegations", and that the "re-surfacing three days before the election is deeply troubling to me and my family". Vuong said the relationship was "a casual but intimate relationship" and that he "understood everything to be consensual." The Royal Canadian Navy would later charge Vuong on February 25, 2022, under the National Defence Act (NDA) for failing to disclose the initial sexual assault charge to his chain of command.

Vuong chose to face a summary trial instead of a court-martial. The trial was held at the HMCS Donnacona, a naval reserve unit based in Montreal on July 20, 2022. Vuong admitted the particulars underlying the charge, was found guilty, and fined $500.

Reactions 
Prime Minister Justin Trudeau, the leader of the Liberal Party responded to the report on September 17, stating "We are a party that always takes seriously any allegations or reports of sexual harassment or intimidation or assault" and that "We are looking into it very carefully and we have asked the candidate to pause his campaign".

New Democratic Party (NDP) leader Jagmeet Singh said that Vuong had either "lied" to the Liberals, or the party knew about them anyways and was putting his ambitions "over the lives and well-being of women". Conservative Party leader Erin O'Toole called on "Justin Trudeau must do the right thing and immediately fire this candidate and confirm that, if elected, this candidate will not sit in the Liberal caucus".

The Department of National Defence announced that the military would also review Vuong's file, as Vuong had failed to share the criminal charge with his chain of command.

On September 18, due to the lack of disclosure, the Liberals announced that Vuong would not be allowed to sit in Parliament as a Liberal if he won.

Member of Parliament 
Despite being dropped by the Liberal Party and his ongoing legal issues, Vuong refused to drop out of the race. He was elected to Parliament on September 20, and announced his intention to sit as an Independent following the election.

Vuong's victory was extremely controversial. Of the ballots cast on election day, he polled 2,261 fewer votes than New Democratic Party candidate Norm Di Pasquale. Vuong was therefore elected as a result of advance polls and mail-in ballots, which had commenced several days prior to the scandal becoming public knowledge. On September 22, two days following the federal election, Vuong said on Twitter that he would "work hard to earn [voters'] trust" and that he intended to address his sexual assault allegations, stating: "I intend to address them at a later date more wholly in a dedicated forum", subsequently participating in an interview with John Moore on CFRB. Vuong added that "allegations of sexual assault are a serious matter, deserving of more discussion than this statement can provide." Vuong later deleted the tweet containing the statement.

Ontario Liberal Party leader Steven Del Duca called for Vuong to "examine his conscience" to see if he could credibly take his seat even as an independent, "given the circumstances of the allegation" against him. He also said that Vuong not be allowed to run as a Liberal at the provincial level even if he was cleared. Vuong's predecessor, Adam Vaughan also called for Vuong to resign, saying that Vuong could not honourably take up a "compromised seat" that he had won via "a compromised victory".

On March 10, 2022, CBC News reported that the Royal Canadian Navy charged Vuong under the National Defence Act the prior month on February 25, 2022, for failing to disclose his initial arrest and charge for sexual assault to his chain of command in 2019. In July 2022, a Naval spokesperson confirmed that Vuong had been fined $500 for failing to tell the Royal Canadian Navy about a 2019 sexual assault charge.

Combating racism 
Vuong has raised the issue of racism and called on the federal government to take greater action to combat racism and, in particular anti-Asian hate. He is the sponsoring Member of Parliament for a petition to the House of Commons, initiated by Marvin Rotrand, that calls on the "Government of Canada deny public funding or assistance to any domestic and foreign non-governmental organizations who promote or engage in antisemitism, as defined in the IHRA working definition of antisemitism."

Russian invasion of Ukraine 
On March 15, 2022, Vuong was among the list of 313 Canadian officials and parliamentarians, including Prime Minister Justin Trudeau, sanctioned by and banned from Russia.  Previously, Vuong and other NATO 2030 leaders had recommended to NATO Secretary General Jens Stoltenberg a "dual-track approach to relations with Russia…  to reinforce [NATO’s] defence and deterrence posture."

Electoral record

References

External links

1980s births
21st-century Canadian businesspeople
21st-century Canadian politicians
Canadian people of Vietnamese descent
Canadian politicians of Vietnamese descent
Independent MPs in the Canadian House of Commons
Living people
Members of the House of Commons of Canada from Ontario
People from Brampton
Politicians from Toronto
Royal Canadian Navy officers
University of Toronto Faculty of Law alumni
University of Western Ontario alumni
Year of birth missing (living people)